H. Z. Burchmeyer was a state legislator in South Carolina. He represented Charleston County as an Independent in the South Carolina House of Representatives from 1874 to 1876. He was documented as a merchant who was free before the American Civil War. He has  been described as "mullato".

He and other African American political leaders in South Carolina were honoured in a 2019 / 2020 resolution.

See also
 African-American officeholders during and following the Reconstruction era

References

Year of birth missing
African-American politicians during the Reconstruction Era
African-American state legislators in South Carolina
People from Charleston County, South Carolina
South Carolina Independents
Members of the South Carolina House of Representatives
Year of death missing